Julius "Baldy" Wittmann was a professional football player in the Ohio League for the Massillon Tigers, as well as the Tigers 1907 spin-off team the "All-Massillions". When the Tigers were established in 1903, Wittmann was picked to start on the team at end, despite never playing the game before. Prior to his involvement with the Tigers, Wittman was the proprietor of a local cigar store and a spare-time police officer. His slogan for the cigar store was "our prices and the Massillon Tigers can't be beat".

Wittmann was a natural leader and an athlete who learned quickly. As a result, he was elected captain of the team during the 1903 season. During a December 5, 1903 game against the Akron East Ends, Wittman was reportedly assaulted by a gang of five men, until several Massillon fans came to his aid. During the 1904 season he was moved to the tackle position. In 1905, while Wittmann kept his title as team captain, Clark Schrontz was named as the team's "field captain".

In 1907, he was a member of the "All-Massillons". Wittmann and ex-Tiger, Frank Bast, were in the line-up for a 1911 version of the Massillon Tigers.

References

1871 births
Massillon Tigers players
All-Massillons players
Year of death missing